Tomas Sandström (born September 4, 1964) is a Finnish-born Swedish former professional ice hockey right winger who played in the National Hockey League (NHL) from 1984 to 1999. Born in Finland, Sandström grew up in Fagersta, Sweden. A skilled power forward, he was effective when healthy but his career was marred by injuries due to his physical style of play.

He was a member of the 1997 Stanley Cup winning Detroit Red Wings team, and assisted on Darren McCarty's game-winning goal in the deciding Game 4.

Playing career
Sandström was selected 36th overall by the New York Rangers in the 1982 NHL Entry Draft. Sandström played 983 career NHL games, scoring 394 goals and 462 assists for 856 points, and also registered 1,193 career penalty minutes. Sandström won the Stanley Cup in 1997 with the Detroit Red Wings, assisting on Darren McCarty's game-winning goal in Game 4 of the 1997 Stanley Cup Finals against the Philadelphia Flyers.

After being acquired with Tony Granato by the Los Angeles Kings in January 1990 for former 70-goal scorer Bernie Nicholls, the two newest additions to Los Angeles combined with Wayne Gretzky to form a potent top line in Los Angeles. The line displayed its full dominance in the 1990 first round series against the defending Stanley Cup champion Calgary Flames, particularly in game 4, with both Sandström and Granato scoring hat tricks while Gretzky had a goal and five assists in a 12–4 rout.

Sandström suffered through several serious injuries during his tenure with Los Angeles. In a February 28, 1990 game that set the NHL record for most penalties in a game with 85, he was punched by the Edmonton Oilers' Glenn Anderson, leaving him with a broken cheekbone. A collision with Edmonton's Craig Muni caused a fractured leg in the 1991 Smythe Division Finals. Doug Gilmour of the Toronto Maple Leafs slashed and fractured Sandström's forearm in November 1992. Sandström was a key component of the Kings' run to the 1993 Stanley Cup Finals, after missing most of the regular season with a broken jaw. Sandström finished third in playoff scoring behind Wayne Gretzky and Doug Gilmour.

On February 16, 1994, Sandström was traded to the Pittsburgh Penguins along with Shawn McEachern, in exchange for Marty McSorley and Jim Paek

On January 27, 1997, Sandström was traded by the Penguins to the Detroit Red Wings in exchange for Greg Johnson. He assisted on Darren McCarty's game-winning goal in Game 4 of the Stanley Cup Finals.

In August 1997, Sandström signed as a free agent with the Mighty Ducks of Anaheim, where he would spend the last two seasons of his NHL career.

Today, Sandström works as a firefighter in Skanör, Sweden.

Achievements
All-Star Selection, Forward, 1983 IIHF world junior hockey championships
Named to the 1985 NHL All-Rookie Team.
Selected to two NHL All-Star Games: 1988 and 1991
In the 2009 book 100 Ranger Greats, was ranked No. 70 all-time of the 901 New York Rangers who had played during the team's first 82 seasons
Won 1997 Stanley Cup with the Detroit Red Wings.

Career statistics

Regular season and playoffs

International

References

External links

1964 births
Living people
Detroit Red Wings players
Ice hockey players at the 1984 Winter Olympics
Ice hockey players at the 1998 Winter Olympics
Los Angeles Kings players
Malmö Redhawks players
Medalists at the 1984 Winter Olympics
Mighty Ducks of Anaheim players
National Hockey League All-Stars
New York Rangers draft picks
New York Rangers players
Olympic bronze medalists for Sweden
Olympic ice hockey players of Sweden
People from Fagersta Municipality
Pittsburgh Penguins players
Stanley Cup champions
Swedish expatriate ice hockey players in the United States
Swedish ice hockey right wingers
Swedish people of Finnish descent
Olympic medalists in ice hockey
Sportspeople from Västmanland County